Dorcadion merkli is a species of beetle in the family Cerambycidae. It was described by Ludwig Ganglbauer in 1884. It is known from Turkey.

References

merkli
Beetles described in 1884